Copelatus subterraneus is a species of diving beetle. It is part of the subfamily Copelatinae in the family Dytiscidae. It was described by Guéorguiev in 1978.

References

subterraneus
Beetles described in 1978